Robinson Ekspeditionen 2008 (also known as Robinson: Fans vs. Paradise) was the eleventh season of the Danish versions of the Swedish show Expedition Robinson. This season premiered on September 1, 2008 and aired until November 24, 2008. The main twist this season was that every contestant was either a fan of Robinson or was a former contestant on the show Paradise Hotel. The fan tribe was called "Tenga", while the Paradise tribe was called "Sembilang". There were many additional twists this season, the first taking place in episode 1 when all of the contestants were made to take part in an elimination challenge. Mirja Østergaard lost the challenge and was immediately eliminated. The next twist took place in episode 2 when Jan Novaa, who had been voted out in episode one, returned to the game. The next twist took place in episode 3 when Emil Debski swapped tribes in order to even up the tribe numbers. In episode 4 a larger tribal swap took place in which Jan Novaa, Mads Jensen, and Michelle Jensen swapped from the Sembilang tribe to the Tenga tribe and Emil Debski, Hilde Austad, Martin Persson, Chiro "Sido" Kiarie swapped from the Tenga tribe to the Sembilang tribe. The next twist came in episode 5 when jokers Laila Neilsen and Nick Zitouni entered the game with Laila joining the Sembilang tribe and Nick joining the Tenga tribe. In episode 6 an individual challenge took place in which the winner would be allowed to eliminate a player from the opposing tribe. Haider Mohamad won the challenge and chose to eliminate Sheila Nymann. Immediately following the merge in episode 7, Haider won the same type of challenge and chose to eliminate Karina Strunge from the game. The next twist came in episode 10 when contestant Hilde Austad used the "Talisman" she had to void any votes cast against her in tribal council. This led to the elimination of Laila Neilsen who had the second most votes. When it came time for the final four, the remaining contestants competed in two challenges. The winners of these challenges would earn the right to eliminate one of the losers. Emil won the first challenge and chose to eliminate Martin and Daniela won the second challenge and chose to eliminate Emil. Ultimately, it was Daniela Hansen from Paradise Hotel 2006 who won the season over Robinson fan Hilde Austad by a tiebreaking cointoss after the jury vote ended in a 4-4 tie.

Finishing order

External links
http://www.worldofbigbrother.com

Robinson Ekspeditionen seasons
Danish reality television series
2008 Danish television seasons